The Bukit Mertajam railway station is a Malaysian railway station located at Bukit Mertajam, Central Seberang Perai District, Penang.

External links

 Bukit Mertajam Railway Station

Bukit Mertajam
KTM ETS railway stations
Railway stations in Penang